The 2012 college football season may refer to:

 2012 NCAA Division I FBS football season
 2012 NCAA Division I FCS football season
 2012 NCAA Division II football season
 2012 NCAA Division III football season
 2012 NAIA Football National Championship